Pleasant Hill is a village in Sabine Parish in western Louisiana, United States. As of the 2010 census, the village population was 1,232. It is best known as the site of The Battle of Pleasant Hill, a Civil War engagement fought in April 1864.

History 
Pleasant Hill was the largest battle of the Civil War west of the Mississippi River. Every April, a reenactment of this battle is held. It is one of the few reenactments staged at the actual battlefield of the engagement.

Geography
According to the United States Census Bureau, the village has a total area of 1.6 square miles (4.0 km), all land.

Demographics

2020 census

As of the 2020 United States census, there were 617 people, 273 households, and 122 families residing in the village.

2000 census
As of the 2000 census, there were 786 people, 293 households, and 200 families residing in the village. The racial makeup of the village was 58.78% White, 35.11% African American, 3.18% Native American, 0.13% Asian, and 2.80% from two or more races. Hispanic or Latino of any race were 1.91% of the population.

There were 293 households, out of which 37.5% had children under the age of 18 living with them, 44.4% were married couples living together, 18.8% had a female householder with no husband present, and 31.4% were non-families. 30.0% of all households were made up of individuals, and 14.0% had someone living alone who was 65 years of age or older. The average household size was 2.53 and the average family size was 3.17.

In the village, the population was spread out, with 29.9% under the age of 18, 8.3% from 18 to 24, 27.1% from 25 to 44, 18.4% from 45 to 64, and 16.3% who were 65 years of age or older. The median age was 35 years. For every 100 females, there were 84.1 males. For every 100 females age 18 and over, there were 76.6 males.

The median income for a household in the village was $18,068, and the median income for a family was $35,625. Males had a median income of $38,125 versus $17,500 for females. The per capita income for the village was $13,188. About 26.8% of families and 30.5% of the population were below the poverty line, including 29.5% of those under age 18 and 43.6% of those age 65 or over.

Education
Public schools in Sabine Parish are operated by the Sabine Parish School Board. The village of Pleasant Hill is zoned to Pleasant Hill High School  (Grades PK-12).

More information 
The Village of Pleasant Hill Historical Marker

Notable people
 Oscar K. Allen, governor of Louisiana from 1932–1936, taught school for a time at Pleasant Hill in the first decade of the 20th century.
 Edgar Hull, co-founder of both the Medical Center of Louisiana at New Orleans and Louisiana State University Health Sciences Center Shreveport, practiced medicine in Pleasant Hill from 1929-1931.

Gallery

See also
Red River campaign

References

Villages in Louisiana
Populated places in Ark-La-Tex
Villages in Sabine Parish, Louisiana